Going Grey is the fourth studio album by American folk punk band The Front Bottoms. It was released on October 13, 2017 through Fueled by Ramen.

Track listing

Charts

References

2017 albums
The Front Bottoms albums
Fueled by Ramen albums